Rutger ten velde (born 5 March 1997) is a Dutch handball player for TuS N-Lübbecke and the Dutch national team.

He represented the Netherlands at the 2022 European Men's Handball Championship.

References

External links
 Rutger ten Velde at European Handball Federation

1997 births
Living people
Dutch male handball players
Expatriate handball players
Dutch expatriate sportspeople in Germany